U.S.D. Arre Bagnoli Candiana ABC is an Italian association football club located in Bagnoli di Sopra, Veneto and represents the cities of Bagnoli di Sopra, Arre and Candiana.

History
The team was founded in 1967 as U.S. Bagnoli. In the 1984–1985 season, played in Serie D. In the 2005, after the merger between U.S. Bagnoli and San Siro Calcio, changed its name to U.S.D. Bagnoli San Siro. Subsequently, changed its name to A.S.D. Bagnoli Calcio 1967.

In the summer of 2018, the A.S.D. Bagnoli Calcio 1967, merges with Ciaobio Arre football team, creating the new football club, U.S.D. Arre Bagnoli Candiana ABC, which represents the cities of Bagnoli di Sopra, Arre and Candiana.

Colors and badge
Its colors are orange.

External links
 Official site
 Official old site
 History of the A.S.D. Bagnoli Calcio 1967 on official old site

Bagnoli
Bagnoli
Bagnoli
1967 establishments in Italy